The 1998 Campionati Internazionali di San Marino was a men's tennis tournament played on outdoor clay courts in City of San Marino, San Marino that was part of the World Series of the 1998 ATP Tour. It was the tenth edition of the tournament and was held from 10 August until 16 August 1998. Third-seeded Dominik Hrbatý won the singles titles.

Finals

Singles

 Dominik Hrbatý defeated  Mariano Puerta, 6–2, 7–5
 It was Hrbatý's first singles title of the year.

Doubles

 Jiří Novák /  David Rikl defeated  Mariano Hood /  Sebastián Prieto, 6–4, 7–6

References

External links
 ITF tournament edition details

Campionati Internazionali di San Marino
San Marino CEPU Open
1998 in Sammarinese sport